The 2015–16 Tunisian Ligue Professionnelle 1 (Tunisian Professional League) season was the 90th season of top-tier football in Tunisia. The competition began on 12 September 2015 and ended on 12 June 2016. The defending champions from the previous season are Club Africain.

Teams
A total of 16 teams will contest the league, including 13 sides from the 2014–15 season and three promoted from the 2014–15 Ligue 2. US Ben Guerdane was the first to obtain promotion, followed by AS Kasserine and finally EO Sidi Bouzid. The three teams replaced US Monastir, AS Gabès and AS Djerba who were relegated to 2015–16 Tunisian Ligue 2. Club Africain are the defending champions from the 2014–15 season.

Stadiums and locations

Results

League table

Result table

Leaders

Top goalscorers

See also
2015–16 Tunisian Ligue Professionnelle 2
2015–16 Tunisian Ligue Professionnelle 3
2015–16 Tunisian Cup

References

External links
 2015–16 Ligue 1 on RSSSF.com
 Fédération Tunisienne de Football
 Tunisian Ligue Professionnelle 1 on TheGoalden

1
Tuni
Tunisian Ligue Professionnelle 1 seasons